Micrathena sanctispiritus is a species from the genus Micrathena.

References

Araneidae
Spiders described in 1983